Medinci   is a village in Croatia. It is connected by the D34 highway.

Notable individuals
Metropolitan Jovan Pavlović

Populated places in Virovitica-Podravina County